Edwin Clarence Pemberton (20 June 1908 – 4 November 1989) was an Australian rules footballer who played with Melbourne in the Victorian Football League (VFL).

Pemberton later served in the Australian Army during World War II.

Notes

External links 

1908 births
1989 deaths
Australian rules footballers from Victoria (Australia)
Melbourne Football Club players